The Warsaw Railway Junction is a set of seven major railway lines centred on the city of Warsaw. It serves the capital of Poland, as well as cities belonging to its agglomeration of over 2.5 million inhabitants. At its peak the lines of the Warsaw Railway Junction served approximately 250,000 passengers daily.

The hub consists of seven main lines going to Białystok, Terespol, Lublin, Radom, Łódź, Poznań and Gdańsk, connected by the Warsaw Cross-City Line and Warsaw Circumferal Line, and the WKD light rail line to Grodzisk Mazowiecki.

Apart from train stations in Warsaw, the hub includes the cities of Grodzisk Mazowiecki, Milanówek, Piastów, Pruszków, Sochaczew, Błonie, Ożarów, Nowy Dwór Mazowiecki, Legionowo, Tłuszcz, Wołomin, Mińsk Mazowiecki, Sulejówek, Otwock, Warka and Piaseczno.

The first railway line in Warsaw was the Warsaw–Vienna railway, opened in 1845, linking the city with the border between the Russian ruled Congress Poland and Austrian ruled Galicia where it connected with the Austrian railways. In 1862 the Warsaw-Saint Petersburg Railway was opened connecting Warsaw through Vilnius (Wilno) with the Russian capital followed by the Warsaw–Terespol Railway in 1866, both lines were built to the Russian broad gauge and only reached the city's eastern part on the right bank of Vistula River, known as Praga, as the occupational authorities blocked the construction of a railway bridge across the river for strategic reasons, only allowing the rail terminals to be connected by a horse tram. In 1875, the Warsaw Circumferential Line was built along with a railway bridge located near the Russian stronghold in the Warsaw Citadel. In 1877 the Vistula River Railroad was built as the third broad gauge line on the right bank in Warsaw linking the city with Kovel and with the border of Polish territories under Prussian control in East Prussia. In 1902 the broad gauge Warsaw–Kalisz Railway was constructed on the left bank of the Vistula river connecting Warsaw through Łódź to Kalisz and later extended to the border of the Prussian controlled Province of Posen. After Poland regained independence following World War I all rail lines in the country were converted to standard gauge and in 1919 the Polish State Railways began an extensive reconstruction of the city's railway junction connecting the former terminals of the Vienna and Terespol lines with the Warsaw Cross-City Line, opened in 1933, electrifying the line (1936) and constructing the Warszawa Główna railway station (opened in 1938). In 1934 a new railway line was opened connecting Warsaw with Radom and further with Kraków finalizing the present day track layout.

References

Railway Junction
Rail junctions in Poland
1862 establishments in the Russian Empire